USS John P. Gray (APD-74), ex-DE-673, was a United States Navy high-speed transport in commission from 1944 to 1946.

Namesake
John Porter Gray was born on 22 December 1914 in Kansas City, Missouri. He enlisted in the United States Naval Reserve on 12 October 1939, was appointed Aviation Cadet in 1940 and underwent flight training, and was commissioned as an ensign. Gray then served at several naval air stations before reporting to Torpedo Squadron 2 in October 1940. He later transferred for temporary duty to Torpedo Squadron 8 (VT-8) aboard the aircraft carrier  and reached the rank of lieutenant, junior grade.

As a Douglas TBD Devastator torpedo bomber pilot in VT-8, Gray took part in the pivotal Battle of Midway on 4 June 1942. Gray and the rest of the squadron attacked the Japanese aircraft carriers without fighter cover and in the face of withering antiaircraft fire and heavy Japanese fighter opposition. Though all of VT-8's aircraft were shot down, they succeeded in diverting Japanese fighter cover and preventing further launches of Japanese carrier aircraft, thus contributing to the United States Navys victory in the battle. Gray was killed during the attack. Gray was awarded the Navy Cross posthumously and shared in the Presidential Unit Citation awarded to VT-8 for its actions in the Battle of Midway.

Construction and commissioning
John P. Gray was laid down as the Buckley-class destroyer escort USS John P. Gray (DE-673) on 18 December 1943 by the Dravo Corporation at Pittsburgh, Pennsylvania and launched as such on 18 March 1944, sponsored by Mrs. Roy C. Gray, mother of the ships namesake, Lieutenant, junior grade, John P. Gray. She then was towed down the Ohio River and the Mississippi River to Orange, Texas, for fitting out at the Consolidated Shipbuilding Company shipyard. The ship was reclassified as a Charles Lawrence-class high-speed transport and redesignated APD-74 on 27 June 1944. After conversion to her new role, the ship was commissioned at the Consolidated yard on 15 March 1945.

Service history 
From there John P. Gray proceeded via the Panama Canal Zone to San Diego, California, arriving 19 June 1945. She departed for Pearl Harbor, Territory of Hawaii, 21 June 1945, and spent July 1945 training underwater demolition teams on the island of Maui. In August 1945 she returned briefly to California to embark an underwater demolition team unit for duty; and, after a stopover in Hawaii, she arrived Eniwetok 30 August 1945. Meanwhile, World War II came to end with the surrender of Japan on 15 August 1945.

The war over, John P. Gray arrived at Jinsen, Korea, on 8 September 1945 to take part in occupation operations. Departing on 14 September 1945, she steamed via Guam and Eniwetok to Pearl Harbor, and was attached to Operation Magic Carpet, the giant operation undertaken to return to the United States the thousands of Pacific war veterans demobilizing after World War II. She made two voyages between Hawaii and San Diego, then departed San Diego on 30 November 1945 for Norfolk, Virginia. John P. Gray arrived at Hampton Roads, Virginia, on 13 December 1945, and then moved to Green Cove Springs, Florida, where she arrived on 25 January 1946.

Decommissioning and disposal
John P. Gray was decommissioned at Green Cove Springs on 29 April 1946 and entered the Texas Group of the Atlantic Reserve Fleet at Orange, Texas. Later she was moved to San Francisco. After nearly 21 years of inactivity, she was stricken from the Navy List on 1 March 1967 and was sold for scrapping on 3 September 1968.

References

NavSource Online: Amphibious Photo Archive USS John P. Gray (APD-74)

Charles Lawrence-class high speed transports
World War II amphibious warfare vessels of the United States
Ships built in Pittsburgh
Ships built in Orange, Texas
1944 ships
Ships built by Dravo Corporation